William Homer Genaust (October 12, 1906 – March 4, 1945) was a United States Marine Corps sergeant who was missing in action  during the battle of Iwo Jima while serving as a war photographer in World War II. He is best known for filming the second U.S. flag-raising on top of Mount Suribachi on February 23, 1945, which was immortalized in Joe Rosenthal's famous photograph Raising the Flag on Iwo Jima. Genaust operated a then-modern and lightweight 16 millimeter motion picture camera which used 50-foot color film cassettes. His motion picture of the flag-raising became one of the best-known film clips of the war, and documents the event famously depicted in the Marine Corps War Memorial in Arlington, Virginia. Genaust was reportedly killed in action nine days later, and his remains have not been recovered.

U.S. Marine Corps 

Born in Sioux Falls, South Dakota, Bill Genaust was raised in Minneapolis, Minnesota. He enlisted in the Marine Corps in Minneapolis on February 11, 1943, to be a combat cameraman. After recruit training, he was sent to Quantico, Virginia, to become a Marine Corps still photographer and motion picture camera photographer.

Battle of Saipan 
Genaust served in the Pacific Theater during World War II and was posthumously awarded the Bronze Star Medal with Combat "V" and Purple Heart Medal in September 1945, for heroic actions using a rifle in a firefight on Saipan where he was wounded on July 9, 1944. He was recommended for the Navy Cross by Norman Hatch, his photo section commander, but the nomination was turned down because Genaust was a cameraman and not an infantryman. He also shared in the Navy Presidential Unit Citation awarded to the 4th Marine Division for the Battle of Saipan and Tinian (June 15 – August 1, 1944). It took eight months for Genaust to recover from his leg wound he obtained on Saipan. He was given the opportunity to return home, but instead he volunteered to go to Iwo Jima.

Battle of Iwo Jima 

Genaust was assigned to help train Marine photographers on how to film in a combat zone. There were three Marine divisions in a force of approximately 70,000 servicemen which included about 60 Marine cameramen training to assault Iwo Jima. Genaust would accompany the Marine infantrymen riding in and on landing craft. On February 19, filming on the way in, Genaust landed on the beach with members of the 4th Marine Division. On the third day, he moved closer to Mount Suribachi where the 28th Marines, 5th Marine Division were located with orders to capture the mountaintop. There he teamed with Marine still photographer Pfc. Bob Campbell, and proceeded to take more film action at the base of Suribachi.

On February 23, 1945, a 40-man patrol consisting primarily of members of Third Platoon, E Company, 2nd Battalion, 28th Marines, 5th Marine Division were ordered to climb up Mount Suribachi and seize and occupy the summit. The patrol was led by E Company's executive officer, First Lieutenant Harold Schrier, who had volunteered to take over the platoon and raise the battalion's small American flag to signal the volcano was captured. The flag, which was attached to a Japanese iron water pipe, was raised approximately 10:30 a.m., by Schrier, his platoon sergeant, and another sergeant. Marine photographer Staff Sergeant Lou Lowery accompanied the patrol and photographed the Marines and Navy corpsmen climbing to the top of Mount Suribachi, the Marines tying the flag on the pipe, and the men around the flagstaff after it was raised.

Around noon, Marine photographers Sergeant Genaust and Private Campbell were ordered to go up Mount Suribachi. On the way there, they met Associated Press photographer Joe Rosenthal, who first arrived on Iwo Jima with the 4th Marine Division on February 19 (he went back and forth from a ship each day), but missed the first flag raising on top. The three photographers proceeded to climb up Mount Suribachi together as four Marines from Second Platoon, E Company, also climbed up with orders to raise a large replacement flag on top. On the way up, Rosenthal, Genaust, and Campbell met Lowery coming down who told them about the first American flag raising. Once on top, another Japanese pipe was found and the second and larger U.S. flag was attached unto it which would make a single flag on top more visible from any point on the island. After the three got on top, Genaust with his Bell & Howell Auto Master Filmo 16mm Motion Picture Camera, stood at the left side of Rosenthal, and filmed the second flag being hoisted by six Marines. Under Lt. Schrier's orders, the larger flag was raised as the smaller flag was lowered.

Genaust's film captured the six Marines getting in place to raise the larger flag, the raising of the flag/flagstaff, and the securing of the bottom of the flagstaff with rocks. Rosenthal became famous for taking the black and white photograph of the second flag raising which appeared in Sunday newspapers on February 25. Similar still photographs were also taken on top of Mount Suribachi by Campbell and other photographers including a U.S. Army and U.S. Coast Guard photographer. Genaust's film also captures other Marines on the summit as they gaze up at the flag during the second flag raising. These Marines are not visible in Rosenthal's famous photograph.

Death 

Genaust was reported missing in action on March 3, 1945, after he was shot in a large cave at or around Hill 362-A, located on the northern part of Iwo Jima. On March 4, he was ruled killed in action. After talking with two photographers at Iwo Jima, Genaust's friend Lt. Col. Donald L. Dickson offered the following account of Genaust's death in a letter to his widow:

As I understand it, a group of Marines were clearing caves of die-hard Japs. Grenades were thrown in one cave and it was believed all the enemy were killed. The Marines wanted to double check and asked Bill if they could borrow his flashlight. Bill said he would go in with them. They crawled in and Bill flashed his light around. There were many Japs still alive and they immediately opened fire. Bill dropped without a sound. As the bearer of the light he had been the first target for a number of bullets. I feel sure he never knew what happened to him.

The Marines forced the Japs deeper into the cave but could not get them out. More men would have been killed in carrying out of the narrow cave Bill's lifeless body.

TNT charges were quickly placed at the cave mouth and exploded. The whole cave mouth was blocked with earth from the explosion and Bill's body was completely buried by it.
Photo section commander Norman Hatch gave some detail on the circumstances around Genaust's death. He reported that, because of poor lighting conditions on Iwo Jima, Genaust had joined an infantry team clearing caves and tunnels. At one cave, a Japanese soldier was found sitting at a table and shuffling routine paperwork. The Marines called out but were unable to get his attention. An interpreter, a lieutenant, was brought in to speak to the soldier in Japanese, but he received no response. As the patrol leader got ready to go underground to investigate, he asked Genaust for his flashlight. Genaust said he would go in himself and talk to the Japanese soldier. Two-thirds of the way into the cave Genaust was shot by machine-gun fire coming from a hidden entrance. The lieutenant ordered the cave closed, and Genaust's body was buried in the blast.

Despite renewed search efforts in 2007, the body of Genaust has not been recovered. He is among 250 Americans listed missing on Iwo Jima, although most of those were lost at sea.

Military awards 
Genaust's military decorations and awards include the following:

 

Certificate of Appreciation
Genaust received a posthumous Certificate of Appreciation from the Commandant of the Marine Corps, General Paul X. Kelley on April 26, 1984.

Honors 

In 1995, a bronze plaque honoring Genaust was placed at the Mount Suribachi Memorial, site of the flag-raising on Iwo Jima.

The Sergeant William Genaust Award is presented each year by the Marine Corps Heritage Foundation, one of a series of awards to both Marines and civilian community members recognizing their work in advancing and preserving Marine Corps history. It is given for a documentary and short subject (15 minutes or less) dealing creatively with U.S. Marine Corps heritage or Marine Corps life.

See also
 Marine Corps War Memorial

References

External links

  (June 1, 2017). Presentation by Supervisory Motion Picture Preservation Specialist Criss Kovac, National Archives and Records Administration.

1906 births
1945 deaths
United States Marine Corps personnel killed in World War II
American photojournalists
Battle of Iwo Jima
War photographers
Articles containing video clips
Missing in action of World War II
People from Sioux Falls, South Dakota
Military personnel from South Dakota
United States Marine Corps non-commissioned officers
Photographers from South Dakota
Journalists from South Dakota